Ali Koti (also Romanized as ‘Alī Kotī; also known as Alkotī) is a village in Mazkureh Rural District, in the Central District of Sari County, Mazandaran Province, Iran. At the 2006 census, its population was 88, in 27 families.

References 

Populated places in Sari County